Stephen Lawrence (born 22 April 1969) is a former Australian rules footballer who played for Hawthorn in the Australian Football League.

A ruckman throughout his career, he debuted at centre half forward in 1988 and kicked 5 goals against North Melbourne in his first game. The following week he was injured and didn't play again that year.

He started to get a regular game in 1990 as back-up for Greg Dear, and after Dear was injured during the 1991 pre-season he became number one ruckman.  He played in the State of Origin and won best player of the finals in 1991.

His father Godfrey Lawrence played Test cricket for South Africa.

External links

1969 births
Living people
VFL/AFL players born outside Australia
Australian rules footballers from Queensland
Hawthorn Football Club players
Hawthorn Football Club Premiership players
South African emigrants to Australia
Allies State of Origin players
One-time VFL/AFL Premiership players